"Beautiful" is a song by Australian recording artist Sarah De Bono, released as a promotional single for The Voice (Australia) on 18 June 2012. The song was originally written with Australian hitmaker producer 'Jhay C' which peaked at number four on the ARIA Singles Chart and was certified gold.

Background
According to Bono, she wrote the song at the age of 16 whilst "going through a tough time, and I wanted to write a song about being beautiful on the inside. That’s what really counts, and I just wanted it to be a feel good track that tells people its what is inside, not outside, that counts. I don’t care what you look like, its your heart that really matters, I want to feel your heart."

Track listing
Digital download
"Beautiful" (The Voice Performance) – 2:23

Charts and certifications

Certifications

Release history

References

2012 songs
Sarah De Bono songs